Shafiek Abrahams (born 4 March 1968) is a South African cricketer. He played only one One Day International for South Africa in 2000. He was born in Port Elizabeth, South Africa.

References 
 

1968 births
Living people
Cricketers from Port Elizabeth
South African cricketers
South Africa One Day International cricketers
Eastern Province cricketers
Northerns cricketers